Fantin is a surname. Notable people with the surname include:

Antonio Fantin (born 2001), Italian swimmer
Henri Fantin-Latour (1836–1904), French painter and lithographer
10311 Fantin-Latour (1990 QL9), Main-belt Asteroid discovered on August 16, 1990
Pietro Fantin (born 1991), Brazilian racing driver
Priscila Fantin (born 1983), Brazilian actress